Lodovico Agostino Marazzani Visconti (1853–1914) was an Italian sculptor and painter who lived in Peru. He was born in Piacenza, Italy into an aristocratic family. Count Marazzani studied art in Florence, and later became known for his equestrian art. The Sladmore Gallaries in London, included his sculpture, “the Equestrian Show” in May 2000 during an exhibition of equestrian sculptures.

References

1835 births
1914 deaths
19th-century Italian sculptors
Italian male sculptors
20th-century Italian sculptors
19th-century Italian male artists
20th-century Italian male artists